Mailson Tenório dos Santos (born 20 August 1996), simply known as Mailson, is a Brazilian footballer who plays as a goalkeeper for Saudi Arabian club Al-Taawoun.

Club career
Mailson was born in Girau do Ponciano, Alagoas, and joined Sport Recife's youth setup in 2014, from São Domingos-AL. He made his first team debut on 4 April 2017, starting in a 2–2 Campeonato Pernambucano home draw against Salgueiro.

Promoted to the main squad for the 2018 season, Mailson made his Série A debut on 24 April, in a 1–1 home draw against Botafogo, as starter Magrão was injured and immediate backup Agenor asked to leave the club. He renewed his contract until December 2021 on 23 May, and played 13 league matches during the campaign as his side suffered relegation.

Mailson began the 2019 season as a starter ahead of Magrão, who subsequently left the club, and renewed his contract until 2022 on 16 September. In October, however, he suffered an injury which took him out of the remainder of the year.

Upon returning, Mailson lost his starting spot to Luan Polli, with both subsequently sharing the first-choice status throughout the season.

On 22 July 2022, Mailson signed a three-year contract with Saudi Arabian club Al-Taawoun.

Personal life
Mailson's younger brother Denival is also a footballer and a goalkeeper. He too was groomed at Sport.

Career statistics

References

External links
Sport Recife profile 

1996 births
Living people
Sportspeople from Alagoas
Brazilian footballers
Association football goalkeepers
Campeonato Brasileiro Série A players
Campeonato Brasileiro Série B players
Saudi Professional League players
Sport Club do Recife players
Al-Taawoun FC players
Brazilian expatriate footballers
Brazilian expatriate sportspeople in Saudi Arabia
Expatriate footballers in Saudi Arabia